Stardrifter is a novel by Dale Aycock published in 1981.

Plot summary
Stardrifter is a novel in which the owner of an interstellar trading company gets caught up in a conspiracy that is looking to rule the galaxy.

Reception
Greg Costikyan reviewed Star Drifter in Ares Magazine #10 and commented that "The importance is not the plot, which is typical space opera, but Aycock's ability to flesh out characters despite slam-bang action and to turn a pretty phrase or two. Star Drifter is fun reading."

The book also received reviews from Voice of Youth Advocates and Gene DeWeese of Science Fiction Review.

Reviews
Review by Gene DeWeese (1981) in Science Fiction Review, Winter 1981

References

1981 novels